Enrique Carral Icaza (July 14, 1914 – November 25, 2005) was a Mexican architect. He was born in Mexico City.

Biography 
Carral studied at the Escuela Nacional de Arquitectura of the Universidad Nacional Autónoma de México (UNAM) from 1933 to 1938, and started his architectural work in 1941. His rationalistic design works had a large impact on the history of contemporary Mexican architecture. His works include residential, educational, industrial, commercial, religious and public buildings, hospitals, recovery and tourist complexes. He also managed projects of the Instituto Mexicano del Seguro Social and of the UNAM.

Carral was professor of architectural composition at the UNAM, and taught also at the Universidad Iberoamericana (UIA). From 1958 to 1960 he was director of the faculty of architecture of the UIA, and coordinator of the UNAM architecture atelier no. 1 from 1975 to 1976. He was founding member of the Academia Mexicana de Arquitectura, is member of the Colegio de Arquitectos de la Ciudad de México (CAM), as well as member of the council of emeritus academics of the Sociedad de Arquitectos de México (SAM).

Projects 
 Architecture workshop together with Augusto H. Álvarez and Manuel Martínez Páez, 1950–1951
 Mexico City International Airport, together with Augusto H. Álvarez, Manuel Martínez Páez, Ricardo Flores and Guillermo Pérez Olagaray, 1950–1952
 Bullring in Acapulco, together with Augusto H. Álvarez, 1953–1955
 Oxford college, together with Augusto H. Álvarez and Manuel Martínez Páez, 1955–1956
 Urban planning project Palmas, together with Augusto H. Álvarez, 1955–1959)
 Holy family church, Portales colony, 1961
 Manacar city center, 1963
 Centro Internacional de Mejoramiento de Maíz y Trigo, together with Augusto H. Álvarez, 1970–1971
 Ricardo Martínez's atelier, 1972
 INFONAVIT housing complex El Rosario, 1973–1974

References 

1914 births
1976 deaths
Mexican architects
National Autonomous University of Mexico alumni
Academic staff of the National Autonomous University of Mexico
People from Mexico City
Academic staff of Universidad Iberoamericana